Times Have Changed is a 1923 American silent comedy-drama film directed by James Flood and starring William Russell, Mabel Julienne Scott and Charles West.

Cast
 William Russell as Mark O'Rell 
 Mabel Julienne Scott as Marjorie 
 Charles West as Al Keeley 
 Martha Mattox as Aunt Cordelia 
 Edwin B. Tilton as Uncle Hinton 
 George Atkinson as Cousin Felix 
 Allene Ray as Irene Laird 
 Dick La Reno as Jim Feener 
 Gus Leonard as Gabe Gooch 
 Jack Curtis as Dirty Dan

References

Bibliography
 Solomon, Aubrey. The Fox Film Corporation, 1915-1935: A History and Filmography. McFarland, 2011.

External links

1923 films
1923 comedy-drama films
Films directed by James Flood
American silent feature films
1920s English-language films
Fox Film films
American black-and-white films
1920s American films
Silent American comedy-drama films